Achtoty (Scottish Gaelic: Achadh Toitidh) is a remote hamlet in the Scottish Highland Council area.

References

Populated places in Sutherland